Saint Frances Cabrini Parish is a territorial parish of the Roman Catholic Diocese of San Jose in California. The parish church is located in the Cambrian Park neighborhood of San Jose, California.

It was founded in the 1950s as a parish of the Archdiocese of San Francisco; its founding pastor was Fr. Robert Essig. The current church building was built in 1963 in San Jose, California. The parish is named for superior general Frances Cabrini, MSC, the first American citizen to be canonized by the Roman Catholic Church.

See also

 Roman Catholic Diocese of San Jose in California

External links
 Saint Frances Cabrini Parish
 Saint Frances Cabrini School

References

Roman Catholic Diocese of San Jose in California